The Hungarian National Independence Party (MNFP), also known as the Party of Racial Defence, was a political party in Hungary in the interwar period.

History
The party was established in 1923 by a right-wing breakaway from the Unity Party led by Gyula Gömbös, and initially had seven seats in Parliament. However, promoting a racist agenda, it won only two seats in the 1926 elections.

The party was disbanded in September 1928, with its members rejoined the Unity Party.

References

Defunct political parties in Hungary
Political parties established in 1923
Political parties disestablished in 1928
1923 establishments in Hungary
Far-right political parties in Hungary
Fascist parties